Herfølge Boldklub is a Danish football club founded in 1921. It is based in Herfølge, a southern suburb of Køge in the eastern part of Zealand. In 2009, the club shared its licence, and merged its professional football with Køge BK to form HB Køge.

History 
On 27 February 2007, the club agreed, at an extraordinary general meeting, a professional football merger with Køge Boldklub, to form HB Køge. The merger was halted by the Danish Football Association in March 2007, due to a missed deadline. Because Køge Boldklub got into financial problems in April 2007, the merger was abandoned.

Eventually, in 2009, the club merged its first team with Køge BK and formed HB Køge, but kept their youth selections separate.

Former players 

  Frank Løndal – made one appearance for the Denmark national team

Honours 
 Danish Champions
 Champions: 1999–2000
Zealand Series
 Winners: 1990‡
 Runners-up: 1993‡

‡: Won by reserve team

Season-by-season results 

Green denotes promotion, red denotes relegation.

References

External links 
  Official website 

 
Association football clubs established in 1921
Herfolge BK
1921 establishments in Denmark
Køge Municipality